The 2000 NCAA Division I Indoor Track and Field Championships were contested to determine the individual and team national champions of men's and women's NCAA collegiate indoor track and field events in the United States after the 1999–2000 season, the 36th annual meet for men and 18th annual meet for women.

The championships were held at the Randal Tyson Track Center at the University of Arkansas in Fayetteville, Arkansas.

Three-time defending champions and hosts Arkansas won the men's team title, the Razorbacks' sixteenth.

UCLA won the women's team title, the Bruins' first.

Qualification
All teams and athletes from Division I indoor track and field programs were eligible to compete for this year's individual and team titles.

Team standings 
 Note: Top 10 only
 Scoring: 6 points for a 1st-place finish in an event, 4 points for 2nd, 3 points for 3rd, 2 points for 4th, and 1 point for 5th
 (DC) = Defending Champions

Men's title
 62 teams scored at least one point

Women's title
 59 teams scored at least one point

References

NCAA Indoor Track and Field Championships
Ncaa Indoor Track And Field Championships
Ncaa Indoor Track And Field Championships